TS-Takata Circuit (TS-タカタサーキット) is a race track located in Akitakata, Hiroshima.

History 
TS-Takata Circuit opened in 2002. Since then, renovations involving changes in the course layout have been carried out several times. At the beginning of the opening, it was 1000m around, but soon the hairpin one corner ahead was moved to the back. In the renovation in 2005 (Heisei 17), a new course with some ups and downs connected from before the old final corner and a final corner with a chicane that continues from there will be set up, and the circumference will be 1500 m. In the 2013 renovation, the chicane in the final corner was abolished. In addition, a new "1800 course" with a total length of 1800m including the extended section to the west was established. In the 2016 road surface improvement, circuit pavement with a high coefficient of friction was laid to reduce swells and seams. In addition, the "1500 course" that does not use the extended section is used in the free running frame at the moment.

References 

Motorsport venues in Japan
Sports venues completed in 2002
Sports venues in Hiroshima Prefecture
2002 establishments in Japan